Grand Duchess Olga Pavlovna of Russia was a Grand Duchess of Russia as the second youngest daughter and seventh child of the Tsarevich of Russia (later Emperor Paul I) and his consort, Sophie Dorothea of Württemberg.

Birth and Christening
The Grand Duchess Olga was born as her parents' fifth daughter and seventh child. Her birth was not greeted with much happiness by her paternal grandmother, Catherine the Great, who stated that "A lot of girls, all married will not tell anyone". She later wrote:

Death
A letter to Catherine the Great stated:

The same year, Gavrila Derzhavin dedicated a poem to her death, entitled "On the death of Grand Duchess Olga Pavlovna", just as he had dedicated a poem to her when she was born. Out of the ten children born to Paul and Sophia, Olga was the only one that died during her childhood years. The funeral was held at the Annunciation Church of the Alexander Nevsky Monastery, Olga's burial place. The Empress herself was at the funeral, dressed in a white dress, with gray hair disheveled, pale and silent. In 1800, when Olga would have been eight, Gerhard von Kügelgen painted a portrait of Paul I's family. Behind the family, a bust of Olga stood high in front of a forest.

Ancestry

References

Bibliography

1792 births
1795 deaths
House of Holstein-Gottorp-Romanov
18th-century people from the Russian Empire
18th-century women from the Russian Empire
Russian grand duchesses
Burials at the Annunciation Church of the Alexander Nevsky Lavra
Daughters of Russian emperors
Children of Paul I of Russia
Royalty and nobility who died as children